Britton Run is a  long tributary to East Branch Oil Creek in Crawford County, Pennsylvania.

Course
Britton Run rises in a pond on the Lilley Run divide about 1.5 miles west of Concord Corners, Pennsylvania.  Britton Run then flows southwest then southeast through the Erie Drift Plain to East Branch Oil Creek about 0.5 miles west of Glynden, Pennsylvania.

Watershed
Britton Run drains  of area, receives about 46.2 in/year of precipitation, has a topographic wetness index of 481.24 and is about 40% forested.

References

Additional Maps

Rivers of Pennsylvania
Rivers of Crawford County, Pennsylvania